The Asian Youth Netball Championship is regarded as the pinnacle netball tournament for the under-21 age group in the Asian Region. The Championship is a 7-day event held every 2 years in different countries across the region.

Malaysia are the current champions.

Results

Summaries

See also
 Asian Netball Championships

References

Asian Netball Championship
Youth netball
Youth